Sanga Nature Reserve is a nature reserve which is located in Pärnu County, Estonia.

The area of the nature reserve is 152 ha.

The protected area was founded in 2005 to protect valuable habitat types and threatened species in Raamatu village (former Abja Parish) and in Leipste and Mustla village (in former Saarde Parish).

References

Nature reserves in Estonia
Geography of Pärnu County